Timba is a village and former petty princely state in Gujarat, western India.

History 
Timba was a Seventh Class taluka and princely state in Mahi Kantha Agency, also comprising four more villages. It was ruled by Kshatriya Chauhan Koli Chieftains and part of the Gadhwara thana.

It had a combined population of 1,675 in 1901, yielding a state revenue of 935 Rupees (1903-4, mostly from land) and paying 50 Rupees tribute to Idar State.

Sources and external links 
 Imperial Gazetteer, on dsal.uchicago.edu - Mahi Kantha

References

Princely states of Gujarat
Koli princely states